Cogazocine (INN) is an opioid analgesic of the benzomorphan family which was never marketed.

See also 
 Benzomorphan

References 

Phenols
Analgesics
Benzomorphans
Opioids
Cyclobutyl compounds